Lorenzo Gabriel (died 1512) was a Roman Catholic prelate who served as Bishop of Bergamo (1484–1512).

Biography
On 15 October 1484, Lorenzo Gabriel was appointed during the papacy of Pope Innocent VIII as Bishop of Bergamo.
He served as Bishop of Bergamo until his death on 6 Jul 1512.

References

External links and additional sources
 (for Chronology of Bishops) 
 (for Chronology of Bishops) 

15th-century Roman Catholic bishops in the Republic of Venice
16th-century Roman Catholic bishops in the Republic of Venice
Bishops appointed by Pope Innocent VIII
1512 deaths
Bishops of Bergamo